All Your Perfects is a 2018 romance novel written by Colleen Hoover that follows the story of the couple Graham and Quinn. It is Colleen Hoover's 16th book and can be read as a standalone.

Plot
The book shows the couple meeting each other for the first time in the past and their present when they are married. In the book, Quinn struggles due to her infertility. The book ends with Graham and Quinn adopting a puppy.

Reception
Upon its release, the novel was included on The New York Times Best Seller list and the USA Today's Best Selling Books list. A review from Kirkus stated that "this depiction of a marriage in crisis is nearly perfect." The author described it as "probably the saddest book I’ve ever written."

References

External links
Colleen Hoover website

American romance novels
2018 American novels
American young adult novels
Atria Publishing Group books